Jacques-François-Fromental-Élie Halévy, usually known as Fromental Halévy (27 May 179917 March 1862), was a French composer. He is known today largely for his opera La Juive.

Early career
Halévy was born in Paris, son of the cantor Élie Halfon Halévy, who was the secretary of the Jewish community of Paris and a writer and teacher of Hebrew, and a French Jewish mother. The name Fromental (meaning 'oat grass'), by which he was generally known, reflects his birth on the day dedicated to that plant: 7 Prairial in the French Revolutionary calendar, which was still operative at that time. He entered the Conservatoire de Paris at the age of nine or ten (accounts differ), in 1809, becoming a pupil and later protégé of Cherubini. After two second-place attempts, he won the Prix de Rome in 1819: his cantata subject was Herminie.

As he had to delay his departure to Rome because of the death of his mother, he was able to accept the first commission that brought him to public attention: a Marche Funèbre et De Profundis en Hébreu for three part choir, tenor and orchestra, which was commissioned by the Consistoire Israélite du Département de la Seine, for a public service in memory of the assassinated duc de Berry, performed on 24 March 1820. Later, his brother Léon recalled that the De Profundis, "infused with religious fervor, created a sensation, and attracted interest to the young laureate of the institute".

Halévy was chorus master at the Théâtre Italien, while he struggled to get an opera performed. Despite the mediocre reception of L'artisan, at the Opéra-Comique in 1827, Halévy moved on to be chorus master at the Opéra. The same year he became professor of harmony and accompaniment at the Conservatoire de Paris, where he was professor of counterpoint and fugue in 1833 and of composition in 1840. He had many notable students.

La Juive
With his opera La Juive, in 1835, Halévy attained not only his first major triumph, but gave the world a work that was to be one of the cornerstones of the French repertory for a century, with the role of Eléazar one of the great favorites of tenors such as Enrico Caruso. The opera's most famous aria is Eléazar's "Rachel, quand du Seigneur". Its orchestral ritornello is the one quotation from Halévy that Berlioz included in his Treatise on Instrumentation, for its unusual duet for two cors anglais. It is probable, however, that this aria was inserted only at the request of the great tenor Adolphe Nourrit, who premiered the role and may have suggested the aria's text. La Juive is one of the grandest of grand operas, with major choruses, a spectacular procession in Act I and impressive celebrations in Act III. It culminates with the heroine plunging into a vat of boiling water in Act V. Mahler admired it greatly, stating: "I am absolutely overwhelmed by this wonderful, majestic work. I regard it as one of the greatest operas ever created". Other admirers included Wagner, who wrote an enthusiastic review of Halévy's grand operas for the German press in 1841 (Wagner never showed towards Halévy the anti-Jewish animus that was so notorious a feature of his writings on Meyerbeer and Mendelssohn).

Later career
Halévy was elected to the Institut de France in 1836, but after La Juive, his real successes were relatively few, although at least three operas, L'Éclair, La reine de Chypre and Charles VI received some critical and popular acclaim. Heine commented that Halévy was an artist, but "without the slightest spark of genius". He became, however, a leading bureaucrat of the arts, becoming Secretary of the Académie des Beaux-Arts and presiding over committees to determine the standard pitch of orchestral A, to award prizes for operettas, etc. The artist Eugène Delacroix described Halévy's decline in his diaries (5 February 1855):

I went on to Halévy’s house, where the heat from his stove was suffocating. His wretched wife has crammed his house with bric-a-brac and old furniture, and this new craze will end by driving him to a lunatic asylum. He has changed and looks much older, like a man who is being dragged on against his will. How can he possibly do serious work in this confusion? His new position at the Academy must take up a great deal of his time and make it more and more difficult for him to find the peace and quiet he needs for his work. Left that inferno as quickly as possible. The breath of the streets seemed positively delicious.
Halévy's cantata Prométhée enchaîné was premiered in 1849 at the Paris Conservatoire and is generally considered the first mainstream western orchestral composition to use quarter tones.

Halévy died in retirement at Nice in 1862, aged 62, leaving his last opera Noé unfinished. It was completed by his former student Georges Bizet, but was not performed until ten years after Bizet's own death.

Works
Halévy wrote some forty operas in all, including:

L'Artisan (1827)
 Le Roi et le batelier (1827)
Clari (1828), in Italian; a modest success, even with Maria Malibran in the starring role
Le dilettante d'Avignon (1829)
Attendre et courir (1830)
La Langue musicale (1830)
La tentation (1832)
Les Souvenirs de Lafleur (1833)
Ludovic (1833), completion of an opera left unfinished by Hérold
La Juive (1835), his first success
L'éclair (1835), also a great success, in the same season
Guido et Ginevra (1838)
Les Treize (1839)
Le shérif (1839), which Hector Berlioz referred to as a "delightful comic opera"
Le Drapier (1839)
Le Guitarréro (1841)
La reine de Chypre (1841), praised by Richard Wagner
Charles VI (1843), revived at Compiègne in 2005
Le lazzarone, ou Le bien vient en dormant (1844)
Les Mousquetaires de la reine (1846)
Les Premiers pas (1847)
Le val d'Andorre (1848)
La Fée aux roses (1849)
La Tempesta (1850), in Italian, after Shakespeare's The Tempest
La Dame de pique (1850), not after Prosper Mérimée's adaptation of Alexander Pushkin's novella
Le Juif errant (1852), after the novel by Eugène Sue
Le nabab (1853)
Jaguarita l'Indienne (1855)
L'Inconsolable (1855)
Valentine d'Aubigny (1856)
La magicienne (1858)
Noé (1858–1862), uncompleted at Halévy's death, completed by Georges Bizet

Halévy also wrote for the ballet, provided incidental music for a French version of Aeschylus's Prometheus Bound, and wrote cantatas.

Halévy's family
Halévy's wife, Léonie (sister of Eugénie Foa) who had experienced serious mental problems during their marriage, underwent a remarkable recovery after his death and became a talented sculptress (she was 20 years younger than he.) In 1869, their daughter Geneviève married the composer Georges Bizet, who had been one of Halévy's pupils at the Conservatoire. After Bizet's death and an alliance with Élie-Miriam Delaborde, the son of Charles-Valentin Alkan, Geneviève married a banker with Rothschild connections and became a leading Parisian salonnière. Amongst the guests at her soirées was the young Marcel Proust, who used her as one of the models for the Duchesse de Guermantes in his epic In Search of Lost Time.

Halévy's brother was the writer and historian Léon Halévy, who wrote an early biography of his brother and was the father of Ludovic Halévy, librettist of many French operas, including Bizet's Carmen and Jacques Offenbach's Orpheus in the Underworld. Léon was also the father, by his mistress Lucinde Paradol, of the politician Lucien-Anatole Prévost-Paradol.

References

Sources
Bureau des Longitudes (ed.): Le Calendrier républicain (Paris: Bureau des Longitudes, 1989).
Conway, David: Jewry in Music: Entry to the Profession from the Enlightenment to Richard Wagner (Cambridge: Cambridge University Press, 2011); .
Delacroix, Eugène (trans. Lucy Norton): The Journal of Eugène Delacroix: A Selection, ed. and introd. Hubert Wellington (3rd edn., London: Phaidon, 1995).

Further reading
Halévy, Léon: F. Halévy, sa vie et ses oeuvres (Paris, 1863).
Jordan, Ruth: Fromental Halévy – His Life and Music, 1799–1862 (New York: Limelight Editions, 1996; and London: Kahn & Averill, 2006); .
Macdonald, Hugh: "Halévy, Fromental", in: Grove Music Online (subscription access); Oxford Music Online, (accessed 15 February 2010).

External links

Hector Berlioz: relations with Halévy
John Ericson, "The First Orchestral Use of the Valved Horn: La Juive"
Halévy's background and family

1799 births
1862 deaths
19th-century classical composers
19th-century French composers
19th-century French male musicians
Academic staff of the Conservatoire de Paris
Burials at Montmartre Cemetery
Commandeurs of the Légion d'honneur
Conservatoire de Paris alumni
18th-century French Jews
French male classical composers
French music educators
French opera composers
French people of German-Jewish descent
French Romantic composers
Honorary Members of the Royal Philharmonic Society
Jewish opera composers
Male opera composers
Members of the Académie des beaux-arts
Musicians from Paris
Prix de Rome for composition